Santiago Chocobares (born 31 March 1999) is an Argentine rugby union player who plays for the Jaguares. On 21 November 2019, he was named in the Jaguares squad for the 2020 Super Rugby season.

Chocobares made his debut for the  national team on 14 November 2020 in their first ever win against the All Blacks.

References

External links
 itsrugby Profile

Jaguares (Super Rugby) players
Rugby union centres
Argentine rugby union players
1999 births
Living people
Argentina international rugby union players
Stade Toulousain players
Sportspeople from Santa Fe Province
Argentine expatriate sportspeople in France
Argentine expatriate rugby union players
Expatriate rugby union players in France